Ernstia sagamiana is a species of calcareous sponge from Japan.

References

World Register of Marine Species entry

Ernstia
Sponges described in 1929
Invertebrates of Japan